The Black Horse was formerly a pub at 168 Mile End Road, Stepney, London E1.

It is a Grade II listed building, built in the early-mid 19th century.

References

Grade II listed pubs in London
Grade II listed buildings in the London Borough of Tower Hamlets
Stepney
Former pubs in London
Pubs in the London Borough of Tower Hamlets